"Hollywood" is a song by American indie rock band Car Seat Headrest. It was released on April 16, 2020, through Matador Records, as the third single from their twelfth studio album, Making a Door Less Open (2020). The song was written and produced by bandleader Will Toledo and drummer Andrew Katz.

Composition and lyrics
The song had been described by Spin as Car Seat Headrest's "aim to make a big leap into alternative rock". The staff further described the song to feature "familiar heavy riffs", "a big hook" and "heavy grooves". Toledo commented that the song was "about Hollywood as a place where people go to make their fantasies come to life, and they end up exploiting other people and doing terrible things to maintain their fantasy". In Pitchfork'''s review of the associated album, critic Ian Cohen described the lyrics as "Eephus pitch" and called it "something that destabilizes through counter-intuitive simplicity".

Critical reception
Writing for Pitchfork, Ian Cohen compared the song as Toledo's "version of Weezer's 'Beverly Hills'" and described the concept as "catchy" and "banal". Upon reviewing the associated album, Jon Blistein of Rolling Stone called the track as one of the most "divisive". Writing for The Observer, Emily Mackay wrote that the song is "pleasingly punchy, but brought down by facile lyrics".

In a less positive review, Alexis Petridis of The Guardian described the track as Making a Door Less Open'''s "dead thud". Petridis stated: "a conflation of guitar and raw-throated rapping in which the spirit of 1 Trait Danger seems rather too evident, self-consciously wacky shrieked vocals and all."

Music video
The release of the track was accompanied by an animated music video. It was directed by Sabrina Nichols. In the animated music video, Toledo appears as his alter ego, Trait, wearing a gas mask, as he takes a journey through Hollywood.

Personnel
Credits adapted from Bandcamp.

Car Seat Headrest
Will Toledo – vocals, synths, keyboards, organ, guitar, piano, drum programming
Andrew Katz – vocals, drums, drum programming
Ethan Ives – guitars
Seth Dalby – bass guitar

Additional musician
Gianni Aiello – guitar

Technical
Will Toledo – production, engineering, mixing
Andrew Katz – production, mixing, mastering

Charts

References

2020 singles
2020 songs
Songs about Los Angeles
Matador Records singles
American indie rock songs
Car Seat Headrest songs